Voiturettes Automobiles A.S. was a sports automobile manufacturer company based in Courbevoie, and later in La Garenne-Colombes, in France. It was established in 1919 by Lucien Jeannin, and existed until 1928.

History 
The company was established in 1919 by Lucien Jeannin, in Courbevoie, France. It began the automobil production in 1924, with its AS Type A2 and AS Type A2S sports cars. In 1926, moved its headquarters to La Garenne-Colombes. It ceased to exist in 1928.

Vehicle models 
 AS Type A2
 AS Type A2S

References

Bibliography 
 Harald H. Linz, Halwart Schrader: Die Internationale Automobil-Enzyklopädie. United Soft Media Verlag, München 2008, ISBN 978-3-8032-9876-8. (in German)
 George Nick Georgano: The Beaulieu Encyclopedia of the Automobile, vol. 1, A–F. Fitzroy Dearborn Publishers, Chicago 2001, ISBN 1-57958-293-1.
 George Nick Georgano: Autos. Encyclopédie complète. 1885 à nos jours. Courtille, Paris 1975. (in French)

Defunct motor vehicle manufacturers of France
Companies based in Île-de-France
French companies established in 1919
1928 disestablishments in France